Little Budo is a 2014 Serbian comedy film directed by Danilo Bećković.

Cast 
 Petar Strugar - Budo
 Sergej Trifunović - Mišo
 Tihomir Stanić - Krsto
 Petar Božović - Božo
  - Drago
  - Mala Sandra 
 Jelena Rakočević - Stela
 Milorad Kapor - Pero
  - Brajan
 Tanasije Uzunović - Vuksan
  - Mirko
 Marko Baćović - Doktor Perović 
 Tomo Kuruzović - Blažo 
 Hristina Popović - Zorica
 Uroš Jovčić - Bajo

References

External links 

2014 comedy films
Bosnia and Herzegovina comedy films
Films set in Vojvodina
Slovenian comedy films
Serbian comedy films
Films set in Novi Sad
Films shot in Serbia